Ozarba chrysaspis is a moth of the  family Noctuidae. It is found in the northern half of Australia, including Queensland.

Adults have forewings that have a pale brown area at the base and an orange-brown area at the margin, separated by a broad irregular black band. The hindwings are orange-brown with a broad dark margin.

External links
Australian Faunal Directory
Australian Insects

Moths of Australia
Acontiinae
Moths described in 1891